Cheil is the usual transliteration of the Korean word  under the Revised Romanization used in South Korea. Meaning "best" and forming superlatives with other nouns, it is used in the names of several companies:

 Cheil Worldwide, a marketing company established in 1973 under the Samsung Group, headquartered in Seoul
 Cheil Industries, an affiliate of Samsung established in 1954 as a textile firm that expanded into fashion, chemicals and electronic chemical materials in the 1980s
 Cheil Industries FC, a defunct South Korean semi-professional football club located in Daegu
 CJ Group, from Cheil Jedang ("best sugar"), a South Korean conglomerate holding company headquartered in Seoul and separated from Samsung in the 1990s
 CJ CheilJedang, a food, pharmaceuticals and biotech company, headquartered in Seoul
 CJ E&M, an entertainment and media company, headquartered in Seoul
 CJ CGV, the largest multiplex cinema chain in South Korea, with branches in China, Vietnam and the United States